The Men's Downhill competition at the 2011 World Championships was the fourth race of the championships, run under spring-like conditions on Saturday, February 12. At the start of the race at 11:00 am CET, the temperature was 3 C (37 F) at the starting gate (1690 m, 5544 ft) and 9 C (48 F) at the finish area (770 m, 2526 ft).  Mostly in the shade, the north-facing slope of the Kandahar 2 course at Garmisch Classic had a vertical drop of 920 m (3018 ft). Fifty four athletes from 24 countries competed.

Results

References

Men's downhill
2011